Nikhil Kumar Banerjee was an Indian physician and politician belonging to All India Trinamool Congress. He was elected as a legislator in West Bengal Legislative Assembly from Durgapur Purba in 2011. He died on 15 November 2017 at the age of 67.

References

2017 deaths
Trinamool Congress politicians from West Bengal
West Bengal MLAs 2011–2016
Medical doctors from West Bengal
Year of birth missing